Kejulik Volcano, also known as Mount Kejulik or the Kejulik Pinnacles, are highly eroded remnants of an andesitic stratovolcano located in the southwestern Kejulik Mountains within the Aleutian Range near Becharof Lake. The volcano lies on the border of Katmai National Park and Preserve and the Becharof National Wildlife Refuge, about 30 miles (48 km) southwest of Mount Katmai. Little information is available regarding Kejulik, according to the Alaska Volcano Observatory, and any possible volcanic activity is currently unknown.

See also
 Becharof National Wildlife Refuge
 Becharof Wilderness
 Katmai National Park and Preserve
 List of mountains in Alaska
 List of volcanoes in the United States

References

External links
 Kejulik Volcano at the Alaska Volcano Observatory

Volcanoes of Lake and Peninsula Borough, Alaska
Mountains of Lake and Peninsula Borough, Alaska
Stratovolcanoes of the United States
Volcanoes of Alaska
Mountains of Alaska
Katmai National Park and Preserve
Pleistocene stratovolcanoes